The Nordic Mine, is an abandoned uranium mine in the Elliot Lake area of Ontario, owned by Rio Algom Ltd. The site has been rehabilitated and its tailings facility is currently undergoing environmental monitoring by Denison Environmental Services.

The site was in operation from 1957 to 1968, during which time it produced 13 million tonnes of ore. The mill continued to process ore from the Quirke and Panel mines until 1990.

Although underground production ceased in 1968, the Dry-and-Pack section of the mill was active for 2 more decades along with several offices and a Security Gatehouse.  The property also became a temporary graveyard for derelict and neglected vehicles from various Rio Algoma apartment parking lots, mine parking lots and trailer park left-overs as people were coming and going during the crazy boom days of the late 1970s and early 1980s.

Other mines in the area
 Stanleigh Mine
 Spanish American Mine
 Can-Met Mine
 Milliken Mine
 Panel Mine
 Denison Mine
 Stanrock Mine
 Quirke Mine(s)
 Pronto Mine
 Buckles Mine
 Lacnor Mine

See also

Quartz-pebble conglomerate deposits
Uranium mining
List of uranium mines
List of mines in Ontario

References

External links
 
 

Uranium mines in Ontario
Underground mines in Canada
Mines in Elliot Lake
Former mines in Ontario
Rio Algom